El Paso Township is located in Woodford County, Illinois. As of the 2010 census, its population was 3,459 and it contained 1,387 housing units. El Paso Township formed from Palestine Township in September, 1861. El Paso is located at 40°44'20" North, 89°0'58" West (40.738800, -89.016034).

The largest named community in El Paso Township is the city of El Paso, Illinois.

Geography

Demographics

References

External links
City-data.com
Illinois State Archives

Townships in Woodford County, Illinois
Peoria metropolitan area, Illinois
Townships in Illinois
1861 establishments in Illinois